Rhabdoblennius nitidus, the barred-chin blenny, is a species of combtooth blenny found in coral reefs in the western Pacific ocean.  This species reaches a length of  SL.

References

nitidus
Taxa named by Albert Günther
Fish described in 1861